The 2022 Sun Belt Conference baseball tournament will be held at Riverwalk Stadium in Montgomery, Alabama from May 24th to May 29th, 2022.  The tournament will again use a double-elimination format.  The winner of the tournament will earn the Sun Belt Conference's automatic bid to the 2022 NCAA Division I baseball tournament.

Seeding
In a change from previous years, the top ten teams (based on conference results) from the conference earn invites to the tournament.  The teams will be seeded based on conference winning percentage, with the bottom four seeds competing in a play-in round.  The remaining eight teams will then play a two bracket, double-elimination tournament.  The winner of each bracket will play a championship final.

Results

Play-in round
All games played on Tuesday, May 24th are single elimination. The lowerseeded first round winner will advance to play the No. 1 seed, while the higher-seeded first round winner will face the No. 2 seed.

Single-elimination round
The Sun Belt Conference announced on Wednesday, May 25th that the tournament would go from a double elimination bracket to a single elimination bracket due to significant weather delay on Wednesday, May 25th.

References

Tournament
Sun Belt Conference Baseball Tournament
Sun Belt baseball tournament